El Bayadh is a municipality of Algeria. It is the capital of El Bayadh Province. This town was known as Géryville during the French colonization of Algeria.

Geography
The Ksour Range is a mountainous area extending between Figuig and El Bayadh. The record of 51.3 °C degrees, which was on 2 September 1979, is disputed.

References

Communes of El Bayadh Province
Province seats of Algeria
Algeria
El Bayadh Province